Xianyang West railway station, formerly known as Xianyang Qindu railway station, is a railway station on the Xi'an–Baoji high-speed railway. It is located in Qindu District, Xianyang, Shaanxi, China.

History 
The name of the station was changed to Xianyang West on 30 June 2021.

Metro station
Phase 3 of Xi'an Metro Line 1 will have its western terminus at the station.

References 

Buildings and structures in Shaanxi
Railway stations in Shaanxi
Stations on the Xuzhou–Lanzhou High-Speed Railway
Railway stations in China opened in 2013
Xianyang